The Board of Certification in Emergency Medicine (BCEM) is the second-largest organization offering board certification in the medical specialty of emergency medicine in the United States.

BCEM allows physicians who were not initially residency-trained in emergency medicine, but that have completed a residency in other fields (internists, family practitioners, pediatricians, general surgeons, and anesthesiologists), to become board-certified in emergency medicine. BCEM requires five years of full-time emergency medicine experience or completion of an approved fellowship, preparation of case reports for review by the board, and passing both written and oral examinations before allowing a candidate to become board-certified in emergency medicine. Recertification is required every 8 years. BCEM is a member of the American Board of Physician Specialties (ABPS) - an organization that allows both M.D.s and D.O.s to become members.

See also
American Board of Physician Specialties
American Association of Physician Specialists
Board certification
Fellowship (medicine)

References

External links
 

Medical associations based in the United States
Emergency medicine organisations
American emergency physicians